Regan Jon Griffiths (born 1 May 2000) is an English professional footballer who plays as a midfielder for Crewe Alexandra.

A graduate of Crewe Alexandra's Academy, he signed a professional contract in 2018. In February 2020, he joined Kidsgrove Athletic on a month-long loan before having a similar spell at Witton Albion in October that year. The following month, on 10 November 2020, Griffiths made his Crewe debut in an EFL Trophy group game against Shrewsbury Town. Griffiths made his League One debut at Portsmouth in a 4–1 defeat on 21 November 2020.

On 31 March 2021, Griffiths joined Notts County on loan to the end of their National League season, making his debut in a 1–0 win over Wrexham on 2 April 2021, and ultimately making 12 appearances as County reached, but lost, a National League play-off semi-final on 12 June 2021.

Meanwhile, on 13 May 2021, Crewe announced that it had offered Griffiths a new contract; on 18 June 2021, Griffiths signed a new two-year deal through to summer 2023. On 4 May 2022, Crewe announced Griffiths had accepted a new deal until 2024.

Career statistics

References

Living people
English footballers
English Football League players
Crewe Alexandra F.C. players
Witton Albion F.C. players
Notts County F.C. players
2000 births
Association football midfielders